Carl Thomas Miles (March 22, 1918 – September 9, 2016) was an American Major League Baseball pitcher who played in  with the Philadelphia Athletics. He was born in Trenton, Missouri. He graduated from the University of Missouri. Miles played in two games, with a 13.50 ERA, in his one-year career. He died in September 2016 at the age of 98.

References

External links

1918 births
2016 deaths
Major League Baseball pitchers
Baseball players from Missouri
Philadelphia Athletics players
People from Trenton, Missouri
Missouri Tigers baseball players